Tilley is an English surname. Notable people with the surname include:
Arthur Augustus Tilley (1851–1942), academic of the University of Cambridge
Benjamin Franklin Tilley (1848–1907), officer in the United States Navy
Cecil Edgar Tilley (1894 – 1973), Australian-British petrologist and geologist.
Christopher Tilley (19?? – ) British archaeologist
Edward Tilley (Mayflower passenger) (1588–1620/1), Mayflower passenger and signer of the Mayflower Compact
Jack L. Tilley (1948 – ), 12th Sergeant Major of the U. S. Army
John Tilley (Mayflower passenger) (1571 – 1621), Mayflower passenger and signer of the Mayflower Compact
Sir John Tilley (1813–1898), Secretary to the General Post Office
Sir John Anthony Cecil Tilley (1869–1952), British ambassador
Kaat Tilley (1959-2012), Belgian fashion designer
Leonard Percy de Wolfe Tilley (1870 – 1947), 21st Premier of New Brunswick
Matt Tilley (1969 – ), Australian radio presenter and comedian
Patrick Tilley (1928 – ), British science fiction author
Samuel Leonard Tilley (1818–1896), politician in the Canadas
Sandra Tilley (1943 – 1981), U.S. R&B and soul singer
Steven Tilley (1971 – ), Speaker of the Missouri House of Representatives
Vesta Tilley (1864 – 1952), English male impersonator

Fictional character
Renet Tilley, character in Teenage Mutant Ninja Turtles

English-language surnames